Chelsea Jade Healey (born 6 August 1988), known as Chelsee Healey,  is an English actress. She is known for playing Janeece Bryant in the BBC school-based drama series Waterloo Road (2006–2012, 2023), Honey Wright in the BBC medical drama series Casualty (2014–2015), and Goldie McQueen in the Channel 4 soap opera Hollyoaks (2016–present).

Early life
Healey was born in Salford, Greater Manchester. Her father was mixed-race, and her mother is white British. Healey's father died when she was five years old.

Career
Healey's television debut was in the recurring role of Katie Moore in BBC Three drama Burn It in 2003. Between 2006 and 2009, Healey starred as pupil Janeece Bryant in four series of the BBC One school-based drama series Waterloo Road, before departing the role in May 2009. Following an extended break from the show, Healey returned to the role during the sixth series in September 2010 as the new school secretary, and continued to appear throughout the entirety of the seventh series. Following the shows relocation to Greenock in Scotland for the eighth series, Healey announced she would be moving north to continue portraying the role. Healey played the role in series eight in August 2012.

Healey has also made guest appearances in the crime drama Conviction; the sitcom Two Pints of Lager and a Packet of Crisps; daytime medical soap opera Doctors—all for the BBC—and Channel 4's teen soap opera Hollyoaks. She appeared in Two Pints… as a member of the 'Chavettes', which Louise had to monitor for her community service; in Hollyoaks she played the guest role of Michelle. She has played two different characters in Doctors: Ilsa Marsh in the episode "Overdue" (2004) and Louise Calvert in "Next Door to Alice" (2007). She also had an appearance in Young Dracula as a vampire reporter in 2011.

On 19 May 2014, it was announced that Healey would join the cast of the BBC medical drama Casualty in the regular role of Honey Wright, the emergency department's new tea lady. Honey is billed as a woman with "big hair and a big personality", and regularly gives tarot readings and aura interpretations to staff and patients. The character first appeared in the sixth episode of series 29, on 11 October. Honey left on 14 February 2015, but returned on 25 July. She made a final exit on 19 September 2015.

In 2015, she participated in the talent show Get Your Act Together and in 2016, she took part in Bear Grylls: Mission Survive. Also in 2016, she was cast as Goldie McQueen in Hollyoaks again in a regular role and was spotted reading her script for her first scenes. She went on maternity leave in July 2017 and returned in January 2018.

In 2019, Healey appeared in the sixth series of E4 reality dating series Celebs Go Dating.

In 2022, it was revealed Healey was in talks to return to Waterloo Road. The BBC had announced the series would be returning  in 2022.

Strictly Come Dancing
Healey took part in the ninth series of Strictly Come Dancing. She was partnered with dancer and newcomer to the series Pasha Kovalev. Healey became the first contestant in Series 9 to earn a perfect 40 out of 40 for her Paso Doble, in Week 11 of the competition. She finished the series as runner-up.

Green numbers show Chelsee & Pasha were at the top of the leaderboard that week.

In Week 6 Jennifer Grey guest judged for Goodman.

On 23 March 2012, Chelsee and Pasha took part in an underwater special of Strictly Come Dancing in aid of Sport Relief, competing against Strictly Come Dancing 2011 winners Harry Judd and Aliona Vilani. After resulting in a tie with the judges' scores, they won the show after a decision being made by Head judge Len Goodman.

On Christmas Day 2012, Chelsee and Pasha once again united as part of a "Strictly Allstar" group of seven previous contestants, for a group dance in the 2012 Strictly Come Dancing Christmas Special.

Personal life
From 2016 to 2018, Healey was in an on-off relationship with boyfriend Jack Malloy. In February  2017, Healey announced that she was pregnant with her first child. In August 2017, she gave birth to their daughter.

Other appearances
In 2012, she appeared as a panellist on the ITV2 comedy show Celebrity Juice, BBC Three show Britain Unzipped, Channel 4 show Vic and Bob's Lucky Sexy Winners and Pointless Celebrities (the Saturday spin-off of the weekly show), and Channel 4 show Come Dine with Me Celebrity Christmas Special.

Healey currently holds the record for being the least able contestant to appear on Pointless, giving incorrect answers to all four of her questions, including thinking that the Olympic host city that is an anagram of "Gin Jibe" was Belgium.

In 2013, Healey joined Jack Dee, Dara Ó Briain, Greg James, Melanie C and Philips Idowu in Through Hell and High Water, a Comic Relief challenge that involved British celebrities canoeing the most difficult rapids of the Zambezi River. They raised more than £1million for the charity.

In August 2013, she appeared on the comedy panel show I Love My Country hosted by Gabby Logan.

In September 2016, Healey appeared on The Chase: Celebrity Special, opposite "The Beast" Mark Labbett and alongside actor Colin Baker, paralympian David Weir, and comedian Alex Horne. In February 2022, Healey was announced as a contestant on the E4 series The Real Dirty Dancing.

Filmography

References

External links

1988 births
Living people
Black British actresses
English child actresses
English television actresses
English soap opera actresses
English people of West Indian descent
People from Eccles, Greater Manchester
21st-century English actresses
Actresses from Salford